Martha G. Kimball was an American woman and philanthropist who is associated with the founding of Memorial Day, an annual holiday to decorate soldiers’ graves.

Early life and the Civil War 
Martha Gertrude Bowen was the daughter of John and Mary Bowen, born in Portland, Maine around 1839. She married Henry S. Kimball the son of Josiah Kimball and Mary Spofford in Boston in 1859. According to reports, she acted as a nurse in Union hospitals and accompanied her husband as he inspected confiscated cotton during the Civil War.

Post Civil War 
The couple had no children and by 1878 made their home in Philadelphia, PA at 4703 Kingsessing Ave. Mrs. Kimball divorced her husband in 1883 and lived at that address for the rest of her life.

Mrs. Kimball became famous in 1889 through a letter written by Junius Simons to the New York Tribune wherein he credited her with suggesting the founding of the Memorial Day holiday. He claimed to have been acting as General John A. Logan’s private secretary when Mrs. Kimball wrote Logan a letter suggesting the Memorial Day holiday. Logan instituted the holiday on May 30, 1868 through the Grand Army of the Republic (GAR), of which he was the commander-in-chief. Simons also reproduced a letter from Logan to Kimball to thank her for her effort.

Martha died on April 21, 1894 by which time she was a celebrated institution in town.  The men of the GAR in Philadelphia buried her with military honors. June 9th was proclaimed “Kimball Day” in her honor. Her story was transmitted across the country as evidenced by stories that appeared later in the Topeka State Journal and the Indianapolis Journal

Memorial Day Controversy 
In early 1890, Mary Simmerson Cunningham Logan, the widow of General John A. Logan, wrote her own letter to the National Tribune in Washington, DC to dispute the assertions made by Simons. Mrs. Logan claimed that while Simons had performed a few tasks for her husband, he was never Logan's personal secretary. She also disputed the meaning of the letter from her husband to Mrs. Kimball dated July 9, 1868. Mrs. Logan points out that her husband's letter never suggests that Mrs. Kimball originated the holiday. In her letter to the paper, Mrs. Logan tells her own story of traveling through the South in early 1868, seeing their decorations and relaying the information to her husband upon her return home.

Regardless, newspapers repeated Mrs. Kimball’s story frequently in the years after the story broke. In 1898, the Journal of Education even included a lesson plan around her version of events. However, Mrs. Logan continued to publish her own version in books and articles over time. She may have been more successful getting her story told as she outlived Mrs. Kimball by almost thirty years and leaving Mrs. Kimball largely forgotten, today.

In their book, The Genesis of the Memorial Day Holiday in America, Bellware and Gardiner dispute both stories. They point out that Logan spoke about the Southern observances of Memorial Day in his 4 July speech in Salem, Illinois in 1866. He did not need anyone to tell him about the Southern decorations in 1868 as he knew about them from the beginning, two years earlier. Bellware and Gardiner credit Mary Ann Williams and the Ladies Memorial Association of Columbus, Georgia as the true originators of the holiday as abundant contemporaneous evidence from across the nation exists to substantiate the claim.

References 

1839 births
1894 deaths
People from Portland, Maine
19th-century American philanthropists